Ahmad Mirfendereski (9 May 1918–2 May 2004) was an Iranian diplomat, politician and the last minister of foreign affairs of the Shah era in Iran.

Career
Mirfendereski began his career at the ministry of foreign affairs and held many posts there. He served as the ambassador of Iran to the Soviet Union in the sixties. Upon returning to Tehran, he was appointed as deputy minister of foreign affairs in 1970. He served in the post until October 1973 when he was dismissed because he allowed Soviet civil airplanes to fly spare parts to Iraq to be employed in the  October war with Israel without consent of the Shah Mohammad Reza Pahlavi.

Mirfendereski was appointed foreign minister to the cabinet led by Shahpour Bakhtiar in January 1979, replacing Abbas Ali Khalatbari in the post. His term lasted very short, just 37 days, and ended in February 1979 when an Islamic revolution took place in the country. Just before the return of Ayatollah Khomeini to Iran Mirfendereski declared that Iran ended its membership from the CENTO which is considered to be an initiative of the Bakhtiar cabinet to establish positive relations with both Khomeini's Islamist supporters and the leftist groups. Karim Sanjabi succeeded Mirfendereski as foreign minister.

Later years 
After leaving office, Mirfendereski was arrested and put at Qasr prison in Tehran where other senior officials were also detained. Then he was freed, and he left Iran and settled in Paris. In the exile he joined the National Resistance Movement headed by Bakhtiar. In 1984, Mirfendereski declared in Paris that the Shah's cancer had been diagnosed in 1974, six years before his death in Egypt on 27 July 1980 and that it had been kept secret until the revolution.

Personal life and death
Mirfendereski was married and had three children, two daughters and a son. He died in Paris at the age of 85 on 2 May 2004.

References

External links

20th-century Iranian diplomats
20th-century Iranian politicians
21st-century Iranian people
1918 births
2004 deaths
Ambassadors of Iran to the Soviet Union
Exiles of the Iranian Revolution in France
Foreign ministers of Iran
Politicians from Tehran
National Resistance Movement of Iran politicians
People of Pahlavi Iran